Lipovo is a rural locality (a village) in Dobryansky District, Perm Krai, Russia. The population was 264 as of 2010. There are 8  streets.

Geography 
Lipovo is located 18 km northwest of Dobryanka (the district's administrative centre) by road. Rogovik is the nearest rural locality.

References 

Rural localities in Dobryansky District